Branchview is a rural locality in the Toowoomba Region, Queensland, Australia. In the  Branchview had a population of 17 people.

History 
Norwin Provisional School opened on 5 September 1924. It was burned down in July 1925. In August 1927 it reopened as Norwin State School. It closed on 13 December 1996. It was located on Clapham Road in Branchview (approx ).

Branch View State School opened on 2 April 1931. It closed in December 1942 but reopened in July 1943. It closed in December 1944 and did not reopen until 1952. It closed permanently in 1966. The school was located on the southern corner of the intersection of Branchview Road and Nangwee Road.

In the  Branchview had a population of 17 people.

Economy
There are a number of homesteads in the locality:
 Lone Pine
 Netherby
 Orroboree Downs
 Springfield
 Wahroonga
 Wando
 West End

Education 
There are no schools in Branchview. The nearest primary schools are Cecil Plains State School in neighbouring Cecil Plains to the north-west and Brookstead State School in neighbouring Brookstead to the south-east. The nearest secondary schools are Cecil Plains State School (to Year 10) and Pittsworth State High School (to Year 12) in Pittsworth to the south-east.

References 

Toowoomba Region
Localities in Queensland